Vanessa Lorraine Echols (born November 8, 1960) is a former television journalist and was the noon and 4pm news anchor at WFTV in Orlando, Florida until her retirement on May 25, 2022.

Echols was born in Auburn, Alabama, attending Auburn High School and later majoring in broadcast journalism at the University of Alabama.  She subsequently worked for a radio station in Tuscaloosa, Alabama, and television stations in Georgia and Tennessee, including WMAZ-TV in Macon, Georgia.  In 1992, Echols began anchoring WFTV's Eyewitness News Daybreak and Eyewitness News at Noon.  In 2007, she was named anchor of a new morning news program, Eyewitness News This Morning, on WFTV's sister station WRDQ.

Echols anchored her final newscast of her career, which was Eyewitness News at 6 alongside Greg Warmoth (father of WKMG-TV anchor Justin Warmoth), on May 25, 2022.

Echols is a breast cancer survivor, and has served as honorary chairman for the Susan G. Komen Central Florida Race for the Cure and was keynote speaker for the University of Central Florida's 2006 Breast Cancer Update conference.

References

 The Breast Cancer Research Foundation, Vanessa Echols, retrieved July 27, 2007.
 Nicole Blake, "Breast cancer survivor to speak", Central Florida Future, October 23, 2006.
 Orlando Sentinel, "WFTV to expand morning news to sister station", retrieved July 27, 2007.  
 WFTV, Vanessa Echols, retrieved November 6, 2017.

External links
WFTV.com Bio

American television journalists
American women television journalists
Auburn High School (Alabama) alumni
Living people
1960 births
People from Auburn, Alabama
University of Alabama alumni
African-American television personalities
African-American journalists
Television anchors from Orlando, Florida
Journalists from Alabama
21st-century African-American people
21st-century African-American women
20th-century African-American people
20th-century African-American women